This is a list of manga volumes in the Saint Seiya media franchise. The first series was written and drawn by Masami Kurumada and was published by Shueisha in the Japanese-language magazine Weekly Shōnen Jump, from January 1986 to December 1990, and compiled into 28 tankōbon volumes.

The first eighteen volumes of the manga series were adapted into a 114-episode anime series by Toei Animation, while a series of OVAs adapted the Hades arc in thirty-one episodes. The series was rereleased several times in different volumes format since 1996. Saint Seiya is licensed for English language release in North America by Viz Media. Viz released the first collected volume of the series on January 21, 2004, and the last one on February 2, 2010.

In addition to the main series, there have been several spin-off series. In 2002, a new manga called Saint Seiya Episode.G about the youth of the Gold Saints started being serialized. It was written and drawn by Megumu Okada, under the authorization of Masami Kurumada. The individual chapters were published in Akita Shoten's Champion Red and later compiled into twenty volumes. In 2014, a sequel to Episode.G titled Saint Seiya Episode.G - Assassin started being serialized. In 2006, two other prequel manga series started being published, telling the story of the Holy War against Hades that took place in the 18th century, 250 years before the original series in the Saint Seiya universe. Both manga are published in Akita Shoten's Shōnen Champion magazine. The first one, named Saint Seiya: Next Dimension is drawn and written by Masami Kurumada, but released at irregular intervals. The second, Saint Seiya: The Lost Canvas, is written and drawn by Shiori Teshirogi, under the authorization of Kurumada. In 2014, manga artist Chimaki Kuori started a new spin-off manga titled Saint Seiya: Saintia Shō, which is serialised in Champion Red.

Saint Seiya

Saint Seiya: Episode.G

Saint Seiya: Next Dimension

Saint Seiya: The Lost Canvas

Saint Seiya: Saintia Shō

References

External links
Official Viz Media website of the Saint Seiya manga
Saint Seiya official website